The Banda myzomela (Myzomela boiei) is a species of bird in the family Meliphagidae.
It is endemic to Indonesia. It is found in the Banda, Babar and Tanimbar Islands.

Its natural habitats are subtropical or tropical moist lowland forests, subtropical or tropical mangrove forests, and subtropical or tropical moist montane forests.

References

Banda myzomela
Birds of the Maluku Islands
Birds of the Tanimbar Islands
Banda Islands
Banda myzomela
Taxonomy articles created by Polbot